Ferenc Kárpáti (16 October 1926 – 27 September 2013) was a Hungarian military officer and politician.

Kárpáti was born in Putnok. He served as Minister of Defence between 1985 and 1990.  He died in Budapest.

References

 Magyar Életrajzi Lexikon

1926 births
2013 deaths
People from Putnok
Members of the Hungarian Socialist Workers' Party
Hungarian soldiers
Defence ministers of Hungary